Helge Thorheim (born 23 June 1948) is a Norwegian politician for the Progress Party. He was elected as deputy to the Parliament of Norway from Rogaland in 2013. He meets as deputy for Solveig Horne, and is member of the Standing Committee on Scrutiny and Constitutional Affairs.

References 

Progress Party (Norway) politicians
Members of the Storting
Rogaland politicians
1948 births
Living people
21st-century Norwegian politicians